Martin Earley (born 15 June 1962) is a former Irish professional road bicycle racer, who competed in the 1984 and 1996 Olympic Games.

Racing career
He turned professional in 1985 with the Fagor team with whom he stayed until 1987. In 1986 he won the 14th stage of the Giro d'Italia and the second of the Tour of the Basque Country. In 1987, he was part of the Irish team at the world road championship that ended with a win by Stephen Roche. After that he rode for Kas and then the Dutch PDM team of Sean Kelly. The highlight of his career was a stage win in the 1989 Tour de France when he broke clear of three riders 750m from the end of 157 km from Labastide-d'Armagnac to Pau. Earley completed five of his eight Tours; his highest finish was 44th in 1989.

After PDM left the sport, he rode for Festina, then switched to mountain biking by riding for Raleigh and then for individual sponsors. He competed in the 1996 Olympic Games in Atlanta in the mountain bike race and finished 25th.

Career after racing
He has a practice as a physiotherapist and chiropractor. He has been a coach to cyclists including Irish Olympians Robin Seymour and Tarja Owens.

Career achievements

Professional Victories (9)
1986 – Stage 14, Giro d'Italia (GrandTour)
1986 – Stage 2, Tour of the Basque Country
1987 – Stage 3, Tour of the Basque Country
1989 – Stage 8, Tour de France (GrandTour)
1989 – Stage 2, Tour de Vaucluse
1989 – Stage 6, Tour de Vaucluse
1989 – Tom Simpson Memorial
1991 – Stage 1, Vuelta a Galega
1994 –  Irish National Elite Road Race Championships (CN)

Grand Tour record
1985: Tour de France: 60th GC
1986: Giro d'Italia: 47th GC; 1 stage win
1986: Tour de France: 46th GC
1987: Tour de France: 65th GC
1987: Vuelta a España: 22nd GC
1988: Tour de France: WD (stage 17)
1988: Vuelta a España: 19th GC
1989: Tour de France: 44th GC; won stage 8; team class win
1990: Tour de France: WD (stage 11)
1991: Tour de France: WD (stage 10)
1992: Tour de France: 80th GC
1993: Vuelta a España: DNF

Major results

Amateur
1978
 1st  Overall Junior Tour of Ireland
1981
 1st Shay Elliott Memorial Race
1982
 3rd Overall Rás Tailteann
1st Stage 4
Professional
1986
 1st Stage 14 Giro d'Italia
 8th Overall Tour of the Basque Country
1st Stage 2
 10th Overall Nissan Classic
1987
 3rd Overall Tour du Haut-Var
 5th Overall Tour of the Basque Country
1st Stage 3
1988
 6th Overall Nissan Classic
 10th Liège–Bastogne–Liège
 10th GP Ouest–France
1989
 1st Stage 8 Tour de France
 Tour du Vaucluse
1st Stages 2 & 6
 1st Tom Simpson Memorial Race
 4th Overall Milk Race
 7th Road race, UCI Road World Championships
 9th Giro di Lombardia
1990
 8th Overall Tirreno–Adriatico
 9th Liège–Bastogne–Liège
1991
 1st Stage 1 Vuelta a Galega
 3rd Rund um den Henninger Turm
 10th Overall Nissan Classic
1992
 7th Overall Milk Race
 7th Züri-Metzgete
 9th Overall Nissan Classic
1993
 6th Overall Tour Méditerranéen
1994
 1st  Road race, National Road Championships

References

1962 births
Living people
Sportspeople from Dublin (city)
Irish male cyclists
Irish Giro d'Italia stage winners
Irish Tour de France stage winners
Olympic cyclists of Ireland
Cyclists at the 1984 Summer Olympics
Cyclists at the 1996 Summer Olympics
People from Dublin (city) in health professions
20th-century Irish people
21st-century Irish people